This is a list of electoral division results for the Australian 2013 federal election in the state of Queensland.

Overall result

Results by division

Blair

Bonner

Bowman

Brisbane

Capricornia

Dawson

Dickson

Fadden

Fairfax

Fisher

Flynn

Forde

Griffith

Groom

Herbert

Hinkler

Kennedy

Leichhardt

Lilley

Longman

Maranoa

McPherson

Moncrieff

Moreton

Oxley

Petrie

Rankin

Ryan

Wide Bay

Wright

References

See also 

 2013 Australian federal election
 Results of the 2013 Australian federal election (House of Representatives)
 Post-election pendulum for the 2013 Australian federal election
 Members of the Australian House of Representatives, 2013–2016

Queensland 2013